Greatest Hits is a compilation album of Ike & Tina Turner's most popular singles. It was released on United Artist Records in March 1976. This is the last album released while the duo were still together. The material spans 15 years, from their first hit single, "A Fool In Love" in 1960 up until their last "Baby, Get It On" in 1975. The album peaked at No. 71 in Australia.

Critical reception 
Billboard (March 6, 1976): Collection of hits from the earliest days to more recent material makes up set that should pull in pop, soul and disco play. Good indication of the role the pair have played in the evolution of rock. Early hits were often recut by English groups, and later hits were often covers of white versions of the same songs. Interesting thing was the way Ike & Tina rearranged material to suit themselves and often became identified with the rearranged versions.

Track listing

Chart performance

References 

1976 greatest hits albums
Ike & Tina Turner compilation albums
Albums produced by Ike Turner
United Artists Records compilation albums